Edward Jennings Knight (November 17, 1864 - November 15, 1908) was bishop of the Episcopal Diocese of Western Colorado. An alumnus of Columbia University and the General Theological Seminary, he was consecrated on December 19, 1907.

References 
 "Death of the Bishop of Western Colorado" in The Living Church, November 21, 1908, p. 79. 
 "The Last Days and Funeral of Bishop Knight" in The Living Church, November 28, 1908, p. 120.

1864 births
1908 deaths
Columbia University alumni
General Theological Seminary alumni
19th-century American Episcopalians
Episcopal bishops of Western Colorado
19th-century American clergy